

Historical or architectural interest bridges

Major bridges

References 

 Idpc.ma - Inventaire et Documentation du Patrimoine Culturel du Maroc (in French)

 Nicolas Janberg, Structurae.com, International Database for Civil and Structural Engineering

 Others references

See also 
 Transport in Morocco
 Oued Fes
 List of aqueducts in the Roman Empire

Morocco
b
Bridges